In applied mathematics, the Johnson bound (named after Selmer Martin Johnson) is a limit on the size of error-correcting codes, as used in coding theory for data transmission or communications.

Definition 

Let  be the set of all q-ary codes with length  and minimum distance  and let  denote the set of codes in  such that every element has exactly  nonzero entries.

Then, we define  to be the largest size of a code with length  and minimum distance :

Similarly, we define  to be the largest size of a code in :

Theorem 1 (Johnson bound for ):

If ,

If ,

 Theorem 2 (Johnson bound for ):

(i) If 

(ii) If , then define the variable  as follows. If  is even, then define  through the relation ; if  is odd, define  through the relation .  Let . Then,

where  is the floor function.

See also
 Singleton bound
 Hamming bound
 Plotkin bound
 Elias Bassalygo bound
 Gilbert–Varshamov bound
 Griesmer bound

References

Coding theory